St. Philomena's College, established on 9 October 1946, was the first 'First Grade College' in Mysore, India. It was opened by His Highness, Maharaja of Mysore. Its motto "Caritas In Scientia" was chosen by The Pope. The college has introduced the CBCS programme in the streams of commerce, management and social work facilitating students to choose open electives and giving breadth to their academic growth.

History 
A Bishop's dream and a Maharaja's munificence culminated in the establishment of St. Philomena's College on 9 October 1946. His Excellency the Rt. Rev. Dr. Rene Feuga, the First Bishop of Mysore, vacated his mansion to make room for classes and the Wodeyars, the Mysore Royal family, donated 29 acres of land to the college.

The College was declared open by His Highness Sri Jayachamaraja Wodeyar, Maharaja of Mysore- a rare honour and privilege for any institution.

Courses offered 
Traditional courses co-exist with the newer, more challenging and contemporary courses such as Biotechnology, Biochemistry, Microbiology, Electronics, Computer Science, Social Work, Communication and Journalism, UGC-sponsored vocational courses such as B. Voc in Healthcare Technology, B. Voc in Media and Entertainment, and Functional English. Bachelor of Business Management (BBM), Bachelor of Computer Application (BCA) and UGC Add On courses in Biotechnology, Industrial Chemistry, Electric and Electronic Equipment Maintenance and Computer Networking are also offered.

References 

Universities and colleges in Mysore
Educational institutions established in 1946
1946 establishments in India
Mysore North